Max Johnston (born 24 September 1993) is an Australian professional stock car racing driver. He last competed part-time in the NASCAR Camping World Truck Series, driving the No. 02 for Young's Motorsports.

Biography
A sprint car racing driver, Johnston made his NASCAR debut for Young's at Eldora Speedway in 2017. In an interview with Motorsport.com, he revealed the opportunity arose after messaging the owner of sponsor Brandt Agriculture on Facebook. He finished 29th in the Eldora Dirt Derby after being involved in a wreck with Korbin Forrister and Ben Rhodes.

He is an alumnus of Magdalene Catholic High School.

Motorsports career results

NASCAR
(key) (Bold – Pole position awarded by qualifying time. Italics – Pole position earned by points standings or practice time. * – Most laps led.)

Camping World Truck Series

References

External links
 

1993 births
NASCAR drivers
Living people
Australian racing drivers